The 2020 San Francisco Shock season was the third season of the San Francisco Shock's existence in the Overwatch League and their second under head coach Park "Crusty" Dae-hee. The team entered the season as the defending Overwatch League champions, after winning the 2019 Grand Finals. The Shock planned to host two homestand weekends in the 2020 season at Zellerbach Hall in Berkeley and the San Jose Civic in downtown San Jose, but both were cancelled in light of the COVID-19 pandemic.

The Shock ended the regular season with 18 wins, 7 bonus wins, and 3 losses. San Francisco faced the eighth-seeded Washington Justice on September 5 in the first round of the 2020 North America playoffs bracket, and after falling 0–2 in the match, the Shock won three straight maps to move on to the second round of the upper bracket. The team next defeated the seventh-seeded Atlanta Reign by a score of 3–1. Moving on to the upper bracket finals, the Shock faced the top-seeded Philadelphia Fusion. Despite keeping the maps close, the Shock came out with a 3–1 victory and advanced to the Grand Finals bracket. As the top North America seed in the Grand Finals bracket, the Shock faced Asia's second-seeded Seoul Dynasty in the bracket's first round on October 8. After the Shock came out with a quick 2–0 lead, the Dynasty evened up the score, winning the following two maps; however, San Francisco won the final map of the match and moved on to the Upper Bracket finals. The team faced Asia's top-seeded Shanghai Dragons in the upper finals, where, again, the Shock started the match with a 2–0 lead, but the Dragons tied up the series after four maps. The Shock won the final map of the match to advance to the Grand Finals match. In the Grand Finals match, the Shock defeated the Seoul Dynasty by a score of 4–2 to win their second consecutive OWL championship.

Preceding offseason

Organizational changes 
On October 18, it was announced that assistant coach Kim "NineK" Beom-hoon had signed with the Paris Eternal as a coach. The Shock signed Talon Esports head coach Lee "Arachne" Ji-won as a coach a month later.

Roster changes 
The Shock enter the new season with one free agent, no players which they have the option to retain for another year, and nine players under contract. The OWL's deadline to exercise a team option is November 11, after which any players not retained will become a free agent. Free agency officially began on October 7.

On October 9, the Shock announce that they would not re-sign their only free agent off-tank Andreas "Nevix" Karlsson, who had been with the team since their inception in 2017. On December 23, the team picked up sniper specialist Lee "ANS" Seon-chang, who had been retired since January 2019.

Roster

Transactions 
Transactions of/for players on the roster during the 2020 regular season:
On April 28, the Shock released DPS Jay "Sinatraa" Won.
On May 17, the Shock transferred DPS Park "Architect" Min-ho to the Hangzhou Spark and signed support Lee "Twilight" Jooseok.
On July 21, the Shock signed DPS Sean Taiyo "Ta1yo" Henderson.

Standings

Game log

Regular season

Midseason tournaments 

| style="text-align:center;" | Bonus wins awarded: 7

Postseason

References 

San Francisco Shock
San Francisco Shock
San Francisco Shock seasons